LNCT Medical College and Sewakunj Hospital, Indore, established in 2021, is a full-fledged tertiary private Medical college and hospital. It is located at Indore, Madhya Pradesh. The college imparts the degree of Bachelor of Medicine and Surgery (MBBS).

Courses
LNCT Medical College and Sewakunj Hospital, Indore undertakes education and training of 150 students in MBBS courses.

Affiliated
The college is affiliated with Madhya Pradesh Medical Science University and is recognized by the National Medical Commission.

References

Affiliates of Madhya Pradesh Medical Science University
Educational institutions established in 2021
Medical colleges in Madhya Pradesh